Kong Ming is a fictional character in Water Margin, one of the Four Great Classical Novels of Chinese literature. Nicknamed "Hairy Star", he ranks 62nd among the 108 Stars of Destiny and 26th among the 72 Earthly Fiends.

Background 
Kong Ming owns a manor at Mount White Tiger located in Qingzhou (in present-day Shandong) with his father Squire Kong and younger brother Kong Liang. He is nicknamed "Hairy Star", which suggests he could inflict terror like a comet, which in Chinese mythology is believed to bring bad luck if spotted shooting through the sky.

When Song Jiang goes on the run after killing his mistress Yan Poxi in a fit of anger, he first takes refuge in the house of the nobleman Chai Jin. Then he is invited to the Kong Family Manor by Squire Kong, where he is asked to be instructor of the Kong brothers in martial arts.

Meanwhile, Wu Song has killed Inspector Zhang Mengfang, Instructor Zhang and Jiang the Door God in Mengzhou, who conspired to murder him, as well as the family members of Inspector Zhang. He meets the couple Zhang Qing and Sun Erniang, who advise him to seek refuge with the bandits at Mount Twin Dragons. He is dressed as an itinerant priest with his hair let down so as to cover the tattoo mark of exile on his face as he travels to the stronghold.

Passing by Mount White Tiger, Wu Song eats in an inn which has only some simple food to offer. Kong Liang comes in with a group of men and, to the chagrin of Wu, is served with tasty dishes and drinks. Unwilling to take the inn keeper's explanation that Kong's food came from his own house and he merely cooked for him, Wu beats him up. Kong Liang intervenes and is thrashed by Wu. Kong flees and comes back searching for Wu with his brother Kong Ming and more men. Finding Wu lying drunk in a creek, they seize him and take him back to their manor, where he is tied to a tree and flogged. Coming to check on the din, Song Jiang is surprised to find the fellow to be Wu Song, whom he has befriended in Chai Jin's house. He asks that Wu be released. Delighted to meet the famous tiger slayer, the Kongs make peace with Wu.

Becoming an outlaw 
After their father died, the Kong brothers get into a dispute with a wealthy landlord and kill him. They then set up a bandit stronghold on the top of Mount White Tiger. But their uncle living in nearby Qingzhou is arrested due to their connection by order of the governor Murong Yanda. In their attack on Qingzhou to rescue their uncle, the Kongs face Huyan Zhuo, an imperial general who has fled to Murong after his defeat by the outlaws of Liangshan Marsh in the hopes of redeeming himself by wiping out the local bandits. He easily captures Kong Ming in a one-on-one fight.

Kong Liang seeks help from the bandits of Mount Twin Dragons and Mount Plum Blossom. The bandits conclude that Huyan is a formidable warrior and send Kong to Liangshan to seek help. At Qingzhou Song Jiang, who comes with a military force, captures and wins over Huyan. They then rescue Kong Ming and his uncle. The Kong brothers are absorbed into Liangshan.

Campaigns and death 
The Kong brothers are appointed as chief guardians of Liangshan's central camp after the 108 Stars came together in what is called the Grand Assembly. They are in effect the bodyguards of Lu Junyi, just like Lü Fang and Guo Sheng are to Song Jiang. Kong Ming participates in the campaigns against the Liao invaders and rebel forces in Song territory following amnesty from Emperor Huizong for Liangshan.

Soon after the battle of Hangzhou in the campaign against Fang La, Kong Ming falls sick and dies of illness.

References
 
 
 
 
 
 
 

72 Earthly Fiends
Fictional characters from Shandong